The Comedy Channel (promoted on air as comedy) is a defunct Australian subscription television channel available on Foxtel, and Optus Television. The channel ceased broadcasting on 1 September 2020.

History
A joint venture between Artist Services (20%), Australis Media (40%), and Foxtel (40%), the channel began broadcasting on the Galaxy platform, and became available on Foxtel on 1 August 1996. After the collapse of Australis in 1998, Foxtel's share of the channel increased to 80%. The channel became fully owned by Foxtel after it purchased Artist Services' (now ITV Studios Australia, formerly Granada Australia) 20% stake in August 2002.

In 2006–2007, the channel moved headquarters from Sydney to Melbourne, into the studios vacated by Fox Footy Channel. Until the launch of Comedy Central in 2016, The Comedy Channel was the only channel in Australia specifically dedicated to comedy around the clock. It primarily features stand-up comedy, sitcoms, animated comedy series, sketch comedy, comedy films, and talk shows.

Comedy Channel personalities include Frank Woodley, who hosts Aussie Gold; Tim Ross and Merrick Watts, who together host The Merrick & Rosso Show; Cameron Knight, who amongst other things for the Comedy Channel hosted Stand Up Australia; and H.G. Nelson, who hosts Comedy Slapdown.

The Comedy Channel transferred from 4:3 to Widescreen 16:9 broadcasting on Thursday 1 April 2010 at 5:30am as part of Foxtel's plan to convert all of its channels to widescreen before the end of 2010.

On 31 July 2020, it was announced that Comedy would cease broadcasting in September, alongside sister network Fox Hits, and both channels merged onto the Fox Hits channel space as Fox Comedy. Its current-day programming was dispersed across Foxtel's Fox8 and Fox Showcase, as well as ViacomCBS' free-to-air 10 Shake.

Programming

Final programming
 Total Wipeout (now airing on Fox Comedy, ABC and Comedy Central)
Original programming
 Just For Laughs Sydney (2014–present)
 Melbourne Comedy Festival's Big Three-Oh (2016–present)

Acquired programming
 @midnight Archer Arrested Development Billy on the Street Black Jesus Chappelle's Show Curb Your Enthusiasm The Daily Show with Trevor Noah This Is Not Happening Deadbeat Detroiters Freaks and Geeks The Graham Norton Show Happy Endings Hello Ladies Impractical Jokers Jeff Ross Presents Roast Battle Jimmy Kimmel Live! Just For Laughs Key & Peele Last Week Tonight with John Oliver Louie Not Safe with Nikki Glaser Robot Chicken Saturday Night Live South Park Thank God You're Here Tosh.0 TripTank Vice Principals Whose Line Is It Anyway? (both the U.S. and UK versions)
 Wilfred WorkaholicsFormer programming
Original programming
 30 Seconds (2009)
 A Night at the Festival Club (2008–2010)
 Aussie Gold (2008–2009)
 Balls of Steel Australia (2011)
 Bedders for Bedtime The Breast Darn Show in Town (2009–2010)
 Brexit at Tiffanys: The Best of the Edinburgh Fest (2016)
 The Chaser's War on Everything - Red Button Edition (2009–2011)
 Chop-Socky's the Prison of Art (1999)
 Comedy Gold (2008)
 Comedy Slapdown (2008)
 Cracker Night (2006, 2007, 2008, 2009, 2010, 2011)
 Dilemma Eck's Rated Shorts Hahn Ice Headliners Hit and Run Home & Hosed Introducing Gary Petty (2000)
 Jimeoin: Over The Top (2010)
 Limo Diaries (2007)
 The Mansion (2008)
 The Merrick & Rosso Show (2008–2009)
 No Laughing Matter Off Their Rockers (2012)
 Open Slather (2015)
 Pacific Heat (2016–2017)
 The Pam Ann Show (2009)
 The Power of One (2006)
 Rabbit's Gotcha Calls (2011)
 The Short and Curly Show Small Tales & True (1998)
 Stand Up Australia (2006–2008)
 Stand Ups Sit Down Statesmen of Comedy (2010–2011)
 Whatever Happened to That Guy? (2009)
 Whose Line Is It Anyway? Australia (2016–2017)
 You Have Been Watching (Australia) (2011)

Acquired programming
 3rd Rock from the Sun  (moved to Fox Classics)
 Absolutely Fabulous (moved to FOX Classics)
 Alan Carr: Chatty Man 'Allo 'Allo! 
 America's Funniest Home Videos (moved to FOX8)
 Aqua Teen Hunger Force Are You Being Served? (moved to FOX Classics)
 Balls of Steel Behave Yourself Betty White's Off Their Rockers The Big Bang Theory (moved to FOX Funny)
 Big Bite BlackAdder Black Books Black Dynamite Brand X with Russell Brand The Chaser's War on Everything Childrens Hospital China, IL The Colbert Report Comedy Central Presents Comedy Inc. The Comic Strip Presents Community Coogan's Run The Comedy Company The Daily Show with Jon Stewart Delocated Deon Cole's Black Box Eagleheart Everybody Loves Raymond Everybody Hates Chris Fast Forward Full Frontal The Gong Show with Dave Attell The Goodies The Gruen Transfer The Half Hour Harvey Birdman, Attorney at Law John Oliver's New York Stand-Up Show Jonah from Tonga Late Night with Jimmy Fallon The League Lewis Black's Root of All Evil Life's a Zoo Kevin Spencer Kingswood Country Malcolm in the Middle 
 The Man Show MANswers Mary Shelley's Frankenhole Men Behaving Badly Metalocalypse The Middle Modern Family (moved to FOX Funny)
 Monty Python's Flying Circus Mr. D Mr. Black My Name Is Earl Parks and Recreation Peep Show Porridge (moved to FOX Classics)
 The Pranker Puppets Who Kill Real Husbands of Hollywood Reno 911! The Red Green Show Rick and Morty Russell Howard's Good News The Sarah Silverman Program 
 Saved by the Bell Scrubs (moved to FOX Funny)
 The Secret Policeman's Ball 2012 Shooting Stars skitHOUSE Squidbillies Stroker & Hoop Summer Heights High Taboo Tim and Eric Awesome Show The Venture Bros. Two and a Half Men Totally Full Frontal Upload with Shaquille O'Neal Whacked Out Sports The Wedge Yes Minister (moved to FOX Classics)
 You Have Been Watching''

References

Television networks in Australia
Television channels and stations established in 1996
Television channels and stations disestablished in 2020
1996 establishments in Australia
2020 disestablishments in Australia
Comedy television networks
English-language television stations in Australia
Foxtel